The 37th government of Turkey (26 January 1974 – 17 November 1974) was a coalition government of the Republican People's Party (CHP) and the National Salvation Party (MSP) in 1974. The prime minister was Bülent Ecevit of the CHP, and the deputy prime minister was Necmettin Erbakan of the MSP.

The elections
In the elections held on 14 October 1973, the CHP gained 185 seats and MSP gained 48 seats out of a total of 450. The CHP was a social-democratic party and the MSP was an Islamist party. But despite the vast difference in ideology, the two parties formed a coalition.

The government

Events
In March 1974, the coalitions foundation was strained in the Güzel İstanbul Affair. The MSP side wanted to remove a nude sculpture that had been erected in Istanbul in celebration of the 50th anniversary of the republic however such a removal was not in line with the democratic views of the CHP. The CHP ended up going along with the wishes that the sculpture be removed in order to keep the MSP in coalition with them.

In July 1974, Turkish forces intervened in Cyprus following the coup orchestrated by the Greek Junta that expelled the President of Cyprus.

Dissolution
On September 3, 1974, Ecevit announced that the political perspectives of CHP and MSP could not be reconciled. On September 18, he resigned.

References

Cabinets of Turkey
Republican People's Party (Turkey) politicians
National Salvation Party politicians
1973 establishments in Turkey
1974 disestablishments in Turkey
Cabinets established in 1973
Cabinets disestablished in 1974
Coalition governments of Turkey
Members of the 37th government of Turkey
15th parliament of Turkey
Republican People's Party (Turkey)